Küriye (Khüree, camp or monastery, also rendered as Kure, Kuren and other variants) can refer to the following places:
an old name for Ulaanbaatar, capital of Mongolia
a banner in Tongliao city, formerly Jirim league, of Inner Mongolia; see Hure Banner
Küriye/Khüree is a part of a number of place names in Mongolia that grew out of monasteries:
[Daichin] Vangiin Khüree, now Bulgan (city)
Mörön Khüree, now Mörön (city)

See also
Khurul - the Oirat form of küriye